The Legislative Chamber is the lower chamber of the Oliy Majlis of the Republic of Uzbekistan. It has 150 members, 135 elected for a five-year term in single-seat constituencies using the two-round system and previously until the new president came to power, 15 seats were taken by the Ecological Movement of Uzbekistan.  Today, the Ecological Movement of Uzbekistan is a full participant, and participates in parliamentary elections as an "Ecological party of Uzbekistan". Elections of deputies to the Legislative Chamber are universal. Citizens of the Republic of Uzbekistan who have reached the age of eighteen by the election day have the right to vote. The citizens who have reached the age of twenty-five by the date of election and have been residing in the Republic of Uzbekistan for at least five years have the right to be elected to the Legislative Chamber. Citizens who are recognized to be incapacitated by the court, as well as persons held in places of detention by a court sentence, cannot be elected and participate in elections.

Voting at elections of deputies of the Legislative Chamber is free and secret. Control over the will of the voters is not allowed.

One hundred thirty-five territorial constituencies are formed for elections to the Legislative Chamber. One deputy is elected from each constituency. Election districts for the election of deputies to the Legislative Chamber are formed by the Central Election Commission by the proposal of the Jokargi Kenes (parliament) of the Republic of Karakalpakstan, regional hokimiyats (administrations) and the city of Tashkent. Lists of electoral districts with indication of their borders and the number of voters are published by the Central Election Commission at least seventy-five days before the election.

The following persons are not eligible to register as candidates:
   
 Citizens who have pending or unserved sentences for serious or particularly serious crimes.
 Citizens who have not resided permanently in the territory of the Republic of Uzbekistan for the last five years before election day;
 Military personnel of the Armed Forces, employees of the National Security Service of the Republic of Uzbekistan, and other armed units;
 Professional ministers of religious organizations and associations.

Chairpersons of the Legislative Chamber of Uzbekistan

Latest elections

References

External links
 

Supreme Assembly (Uzbekistan)
Uzbekistan
Government of Uzbekistan
2005 establishments in Uzbekistan